Mieczysław Łoza (6 January 1916 – 21 May 1982) was a Polish actor. He appeared in more than 40 films and television shows between 1952 and 1982. He was married to the actress Halina Buyno-Łoza.

Selected filmography
 Lotna (1959)

References

External links

1916 births
1982 deaths
Polish male film actors
Actors from Lublin